Giulia Pennella (born 27 October 1989, in San Miniato) is an Italian hurdler.

Biography
She has won four times the individual national championship. Her personal best in the 100 metres hurdles is 13.03, held on 2 July 2014 in Savona.

Achievements

National titles
 Italian Athletics Championships
 100 m hurdles: 2016
 Italian Athletics Indoor Championships
 60 m hurdles: 2011, 2014, 2015, 2016

References

External links
 

1989 births
Italian female hurdlers
Living people
Sportspeople from the Province of Pisa
European Games competitors for Italy
Athletes (track and field) at the 2019 European Games
20th-century Italian women
21st-century Italian women